LGFL may mean:

 Lancashire Grid for Learning 
 Legal & General Franchising Ltd, a subsidiary of Legal & General
 London Grid for Learning